Pennsylvania Route 982 (PA 982) is a state highway which runs 32.15 miles across Fayette and Westmoreland counties, in southwestern Pennsylvania. The highway begins at U.S. Route 119 (US 119) in Moyer, Pennsylvania, and runs northward into Westmoreland County, passing through the towns of Youngstown, Latrobe, and Derry before ending at US 22/US 119 near Blairsville.

Route description

PA 982 begins at US 119 near Moyer. From there, it runs northeast across rural Fayette County, meeting PA 31 at the Fayette/Westmoreland county line. The route continues into rural Westmoreland County, crossing the Pennsylvania Turnpike (I-70/I-76) without access.

The route intersects PA 130 about two miles (3 km) southeast of Pleasant Unity, where it is briefly concurrent with PA 130 as the route heads north and east through the village of Lycippus. The route then passes through the borough of Youngstown, and then meets US 30 at a cloverleaf interchange.

The route runs along the eastern end of the city of Latrobe and through McChesneytown. PA 982 then ends at US 22 and US 119 near the borough of Blairsville. Before the construction of the Conemaugh Dam, PA 982 used to occupy Livermore Road, across from its current terminus, and continued on, crossing the Conemaugh River at Livermore, and connecting with PA 217 a few miles north in Indiana County.

Remnants of this section, before Newport Road, can still be seen at the Virginia Farms tract, which is owned by the Army Corps of Engineers for flood control, and leased to the Game Commission for public use. A small parking spot next to the gate provides easy access, and the remaining surface is well intact, running all the way to the Conemaugh River, at the former site of Fillmore, on the opposite side from Livermore. This area (Virginia Farms), has a rich history dating back to colonial settlement, and along the former surface, foundations as well as a small bridge crossing a creek can still be seen.

Major intersections

PA 982 Truck

Pennsylvania Route 982 Truck is a truck route that bypasses a weight restricted bridge over Stony Run where trucks over 32 tons (40 for combination loads) are prohibited.  The route follows Industrial Boulevard, PA 981 and US 22/119 through Westmoreland County, Pennsylvania. The route was signed in 2013.

See also

References

External links

Pennsylvania Highways: PA 982

981
Transportation in Fayette County, Pennsylvania
Transportation in Westmoreland County, Pennsylvania